Jaffrabad is a census town in North East district in the Indian state of Delhi.

Demographics
 India census, Jaffrabad had a population of 57,460. Males and Females contribute 53% and 47% respectively.

Jaffrabad has an average literacy rate of 62%, higher than the national average of 59.5%: male literacy is 67%, and female literacy is 56%.

In Jaffrabad, 16% of the population is under 6 years of age.

Religion

According to the census of 2011, in the Jaffrabad area of North East Delhi, the Muslim population is 96%, the remaining 4% is Hindus, Sikhs and others.

References

Cities and towns in North East Delhi district
Neighbourhoods in Delhi